Mansard Roof House is a historic home located at Fayetteville, Cumberland County, North Carolina. It was built in 1883, and is a -story, three bay by six bay, Second Empire style frame dwelling.  It has a side-hall plan and rear wing.  It features a mansard roof covered with diaper-patterned pressed metal and wraparound porch.

It was listed on the National Register of Historic Places in 1973.

References

Houses on the National Register of Historic Places in North Carolina
Second Empire architecture in North Carolina
Houses completed in 1883
Houses in Fayetteville, North Carolina
National Register of Historic Places in Cumberland County, North Carolina